On Transparency International's 2022 Corruption Perceptions Index, Senegal scored 43 on a scale from 0 ("highly corrupt") to 100 ("very clean"). When ranked by score, Senegal ranked 72nd among the 180 countries in the Index, where the country ranked first is perceived to have the most honest public sector.  For comparison, Senegal's score was also the average score in 2022; the best score was 90 (ranked 1), the worst score was 12 (ranked 180).

President Macky Sall of Senegal has taken some significant efforts to combat corruption in Senegal, including the establishment of several anti-corruption agencies, such as the Ministry of the Promotion of Good Governance and the reactivated Court of Repression of Economic and Financial Crime. The prosecution of corruption committed by officials has also increased under Sall's administration.

The investigation into former President Abdoulaye Wade and his administration continues in 2014 after being charged for massive embezzlement and misuse of public funds. Corruption is common among low-level officials and petty corruption is a fact of daily life.

References

External links
Senegal Corruption Profile from the Business Anti-Corruption Portal

Senegal
Crime in Senegal
Politics of Senegal